Kordia antarctica is a Gram-negative, chemoheterotrophic, facultatively anaerobic and non-motile bacterium from the genus Kordia which has been isolated from seawater from the Antarctic.

References

Flavobacteria
Bacteria described in 2013